Zlatko Celent (20 July 1952 in Split – 25 February 1992 in Pag) was a Yugoslav rower. He was part of the team which won a bronze in coxed pair in the 1980 Summer Olympics in Moscow.

References

1952 births
1992 deaths
Croatian male rowers
Yugoslav male rowers
Olympic rowers of Yugoslavia
Rowers at the 1976 Summer Olympics
Rowers at the 1980 Summer Olympics
Rowers at the 1984 Summer Olympics
Rowers at the 1988 Summer Olympics
Olympic bronze medalists for Yugoslavia
Olympic medalists in rowing
Medalists at the 1980 Summer Olympics
Rowers from Split, Croatia
Burials at Lovrinac Cemetery